The women's shot put event at the 1967 European Indoor Games was held on 12 March in Prague.

Results

References

Shot put at the European Athletics Indoor Championships
Shot